The Association of Health Care Journalists is an independent, nonprofit organization dedicated to advancing public understanding of health care issues. Its mission is to improve the quality, accuracy and visibility of health care reporting, writing and editing. There are more than 1,500 members of AHCJ. The Association is based in Columbia, Missouri, at the Missouri School of Journalism.

The Current Board of Directors includes professionals from the Boston Globe, STAT, the University of Georgia, Spectrum, NPR, MedPage Today, PBS Ideastream, and Des Moines Register.

History
The Association incorporated in 1998 and procured 501(c)3 status in 1999. In 2004 (at the fifth national conference in Minneapolis), the membership approved the conversion of the Association to a 501(c)6 trade association with a supporting 501(c)3 charitable organization - the Center for Excellence in Health Care Journalism. The association holds annual meetings, publishes newsletters, operates a website and advocates on behalf of health journalists and the free flow of information. The Center presents training events, publishes educational materials and undertakes other educational projects aimed at improving the state of health journalism.

Resources
AHCJ and the Center offer a number of resources and services intended to help journalists do in-depth and accurate reporting on health and health care issues. Its initiatives include the Awards for Excellence in Health Care Journalism, an active Web site and blog, annual conferences, smaller training events, online training, and fellowships.

Awards
The Awards for Excellence in Health Care Journalism are notable as the only awards program for health journalism that is not influenced or funded by commercial or special-interest groups, an issue that has received scrutiny recently.

The Association advocates for high ethical standards in health care reporting and has taken a position against news organizations entering into arrangements with hospitals that improperly influence health coverage, urged reporters to resist signing confidentiality agreements with hospitals and opposed secrecy clauses in contracts between medical device manufacturers and hospitals.

References

External links

Blog

See also
Medical Journalists' Association - similar professional organization in United Kingdom
 - medical journalism in Germany

Medical journalism